Cape Charles Coastal Habitat Natural Area Preserve is a  Natural Area Preserve located in Northampton County, Virginia on the Chesapeake Bay side of Virginia's Eastern Shore. The small preserve protects coastal beach, dune, and maritime forest habitat, preserving a home for the northeastern beach tiger beetle (Cicindela dorsalis), listed as threatened in the United States.  Coast bedstraw (Galium hispidulum) grows on the dunes. The preserve serves as a staging area for southward-bound migratory birds in the fall.

Cape Charles Coastal Habitat Natural Area Preserve is owned and maintained by the Virginia Department of Conservation and Recreation, and is open to public. Public access is limited to a boardwalk that facilitates viewing the preserve; access to the beach is allowed only for research and management purposes.

See also
 List of Virginia Natural Area Preserves

References

External links
Virginia Department of Conservation and Recreation: Cape Charles Coastal Habitat Natural Area Preserve

Virginia Natural Area Preserves
Protected areas of Northampton County, Virginia